The Jose B. Lingad Memorial General Hospital is located in San Fernando, Pampanga, Philippines.  It is a Level III tertiary, training and teaching hospital with 250 authorized beds as mandated by Republic Act (R.A.) 6780 enacted in 1990.  The hospital caters to the people of Region III, with the people of Pampanga as its primary catchment area and the nearby provinces of Bataan, Nueva Ecija, Bulacan, Tarlac, Zambales and Aurora as its secondary catchment areas.

History
In the nearly 100 years of existence of the Jose B. Lingad Memorial Regional Hospital, enormous development had been done in terms of facility improvement, manpower complement and capability enhancement. Indeed, the hospital had come a long way. From its beginning in 1921 from the two (2) hectare lot at Dolores, San Fernando, Pampanga donated by the late Juan Teopaco, it is now regarded as one of the leading referral center in the region.

The JBLMRH started at an eight (8) bed capacity hospital formerly known as Pampanga Provincial Hospital. It was financed and operated by provincial health funds under the management of six pioneering individuals headed by Dr. Lorenzo de Jesus. To satisfy the growing hospital need of the people, various material improvements were introduced in the hospital, thus increasing its bed capacity from eight (8) beds to fifty (50) beds in January 1951. Later in July 1964, the hospital's name changed into Central Luzon General Hospital with the corresponding increase in its bed capacity to one hundred twenty five (125) beds. Dr. Bartolome Vecta was appointed as Chief of Hospital during this time. Further construction of various facilities in the hospital led to the increase in its bed capacity to one hundred fifty (150) in 1972 and again to two hundred beds (200) in 1975. In 1979, Dr. Vecta was replaced by Dr. Ignacio Valencia. During the incumbency of Dr. Valencia, a building that can accommodate one hundred beds was constructed, thus finally increasing the hospital's bed capacity into two hundred fifty (250) beds. Dr. Conrado Mariano took the helm of managing the hospital after Dr. Ignacio Valencia. In March 1988, Dr. Mariano was promoted to Assistant Regional Director at the Regional Health Office No. 3, hence he was replaced by the then Provincial Health Officer of Bataan in the person of Dr. Rogelio Reyes. Dr. Reyes served the hospital for three years until finally in February 1991 he retired to give way to his political ambition.

On November 25, 1989, RA No. 6780 entitled “An Act of Changing the Name of the Central Luzon General Hospital located in the municipality of San Fernando, province of Pampanga, to Jose B. Lingad Memorial General Hospital” was one of the bills signed by the then former President Corazon C. Aquino. It is on this day on that the hospital was recognized as Jose B. Lingad Memorial General Hospital. Dra. Venus Galang, the then Chief of Medical Professional Staff was appointed as Officer-in-Charge in March 1991 to fill-in the position left by Dr. Reyes. During the term of Dra. Galang, the hospital was being awarded for being a Baby Friendly Hospital. In December 1992, Dr. Ladislao Yuchongco was appointed as permanent Chief of Hospital of Jose B. Lingad Memorial Regional Hospital. In his term, he was able to accomplish the accreditation of the Anesthesia Department.

In 1994, Dr. Ladislao Yuchongco was reassigned at the National Mental Health Hospital. From this period until May 1998 the following doctors became Officers-in-Charge :

Dr. Ricardo T. Trinidad - January 1992 to December 1997

Dr. Emilio Cadayona  - July 4, to March 21, 1995,

Dr. Manuel Ponce  - March 22 to January 24, 1996,

Dra Venus Galang   - February 1, 1996 to March 5, 1996,

On January 20, 1997, until March 25, 1997, Dr. Ladislao Yuchongco resumed his post as Chief of Hospital of JBLMRH until he was reassigned to DOH-Central Office.

From March 26, 1997, until May 17, 1998, Dr. Ricardo B. Gonzales, Dra. Cecilia Paulino and Dra. Ethelyn Nieto successively became officers-in-charge of the hospital.

On May 18, 1998, Dr. Venancio S. Banzon from the Provincial Health Office of Bulacan was appointed Chief of Hospital. Dr. Banzon is until the present time occupies the said position.

The JBLMRH today

The Jose B. Lingad Memorial Regional Hospital is a Level III tertiary, teaching and training hospital with 250 authorized beds as mandated by R.A.  6780 year 1990. The hospital caters to the people of Region III with the people of Pampanga as its primary catchment area and the nearby provinces of Bataan, Nueva Ecija, Bulacan, Tarlac, Zambales and Aurora as its secondary catchment areas.

In 2012, Republic Act No. 10355, “An Act increasing the Bed Capacity of Jose B. Lingad Memorial General Hospital in San Fernando City, Pampanga from Two Hundred Fifty (250) to Five Hundred (500). Upgrading its Services and Facilities and Professional Health Care, Authorizing the Increase of its Medical Personnel and Appropriating Funds therefore” was signed by President Benigno Simeon C. Aquino.

Jose B. Lingad Memorial Regional Hospital shall continue its quality improvement program based on the Standards of ISO 9001:2008 in consonance with the Department of Health Standards which sets policies and standard operating procedures consistent with the DOH policies and thrust.

The Jose B. Lingad Memorial Regional Hospital is one of the retained Government Hospital in Region III of Department of Health, classified as Tertiary Teaching Hospital, with 500 authorized bed capacity with current license Number 03-139-14-500-CP-1.

See also
 Jose B. Lingad

References

Hospitals in the Philippines
Hospitals established in 1921
Buildings and structures in San Fernando, Pampanga
1921 establishments in the Philippines